Amil Yunanov (born 6 January 1993) is an Azerbaijani professional footballer who plays as a striker for Azerbaijan Premier League side Shamakhi.

Career

Club
On 14 June 2018, Yunanov signed a one-year contract with Keşla FK. 

On 4 June 2019, Yunanov signed a one-year contract with Sumgayit FK.

International
On 26 May 2016 Yunanov made his senior international debut for Azerbaijan friendly match against Andorra.

Career statistics

International

Statistics accurate as of match played 29 May 2018

References

External links
 

Living people
1993 births
Association football forwards
Azerbaijani footballers
Azerbaijan youth international footballers
Azerbaijan international footballers
Azerbaijan Premier League players
Gabala FC players
Ravan Baku FC players
Sumgayit FK players
Shamakhi FK players
People from Tovuz